Chipps Island is a small island in Suisun Bay, California. It is part of Solano County. In 1959, the state of California used Chipps Island in a legal definition of the western boundary of the Sacramento–San Joaquin River Delta.

In 1960s, during efforts to devise large-scale hydrological engineering projects in San Francisco Bay and adjacent estuaries, Chipps Island was proposed as the site of a dam across the Carquinez Strait as a "more feasible" alternative to the very expensive Reber Plan. The Chipps Island dam was estimated to cost $194,400,000 in 1963 , and retain  of fresh water (which would otherwise be emptied into the Pacific Ocean). However, the project faced barriers to implementation, including potential hazards to wildlife (as it was expected to cause the flow of the San Joaquin River to reverse during part of salmon's migration period, preventing them from swimming upstream).
 The Sacramento Bee quoted "state fish and wildlife experts" as saying that the "seriousness of this apparently insolvable problem" was significant enough to "postpone further investigation of the other effects of the Chipps Island plan". By 1964, new plans from the Inter-Agency Delta Committee had "discarded" the Chipps Island water barrier in plans for managing freshwater in the region.

Chipps Island is located close to hydrocarbon deposits, and in 1967, bids were opened for oil and gas rights on parcels in the vicinity of the island. 

While a duck club had once operated on Chipps Island, it was in disuse by the mid-1970s; in 1974, police arrested a "bustling" ring of illicit amphetamine producers using the abandoned structures to store large amounts of the stimulant.

In the 2010s, Chipps Island was part of a large purchase of Delta land attempted by the Metropolitan Water District of Southern California (along with nearby Bouldin and Bacon Islands, as well as much of the Holland and Webb Tracts). The district was subsequently sued by several northern California environmental groups, water agencies, and the counties of Contra Costa and San Joaquin.

References

Islands of the San Francisco Bay Area
Islands of Northern California
Islands of Solano County, California
Islands of Suisun Bay